Celebrity Big Brother 2017 may refer to:

Celebrity Big Brother 19
Celebrity Big Brother 20